The New Oxford History of England is a book series on the history of the British Isles. It was commissioned in 1992 and produced eleven volumes by 2010, but as of September 2022, no more volumes. It is the successor to the Oxford History of England (1934–86).

The volumes published are (as of September 2022) as follows:

England under the Norman and Angevin Kings, 1075–1225 — Robert Bartlett (2002), 
Plantagenet England, 1225–1360 — Michael Prestwich (2005),  
Shaping the Nation: England, 1360–1461 — G. L. Harriss (2005), 
The Later Tudors: England, 1547–1603 — Penry Williams (1995), 
A Land of Liberty? England, 1689–1727 — Julian Hoppit (2002), Paperback: ; Hardcover: 
A Polite and Commercial People: England, 1727–1783 — Paul Langford (1989), 
A Mad, Bad, and Dangerous People? England, 1783–1846 — Boyd Hilton (2006), 
The Mid-Victorian Generation, 1846–1886 — K. Theodore Hoppen (1998), 
A New England? Peace and War, 1886–1918 — G. R. Searle (2005), 
Seeking a Role: The United Kingdom, 1951–1970 — Brian Harrison (2009), 
Finding a Role? The United Kingdom, 1970–1990 — Brian Harrison (2010), Paperback: ; Hardcover:

See also 
Penguin History of Britain (1986–2018)
The Oxford History of the British Empire (1998–99)

References 

Series of history books